The Bible Fellowship Church is a conservative pietistic Christian denomination with Mennonite roots.

History
The Bible Fellowship Church (BFC) history begins with the formation of the Evangelische Mennoniten Gemeinschaft (Evangelical Mennonite Society) on September 24, 1858 in Milford Township, Lehigh County, Pennsylvania. Seven Mennonites who had come under the influence of revivalism—elder William Gehman, bishop William N. Shelly, preachers Henry Diehl and David Henning, and deacons David Gehman, Jacob Gottschall and Joseph Schneider—refused to surrender to the pressure from their bishops to give up their evangelism. Instead they formed the new society, which combined Mennonite doctrine with enthusiastic evangelism. The Evangelical Mennonites of Pennsylvania consolidated with the United Mennonites (org. 1875) to become the Evangelical United Mennonites in November 1879. In 1883 the Brethren in Christ in Ohio merged with the Evangelical United Mennonites to form the Mennonite Brethren in Christ. The Bible Fellowship Church (as the Pennsylvania Conference of the Mennonite Brethren in Christ) shares a common history of the Mennonite Brethren in Christ (which became the Missionary Church) until 1952. In the 1940s, the relationship of the Pennsylvania Conference with the other Mennonite Brethren in Christ conferences was strained. Disagreements existed over doctrine and ecclesiology, and these were intensified by personality differences. In 1947, the General Conference of the Mennonite Brethren in Christ changed the name of the denomination to the United Missionary Church. The Pennsylvania Conference disagreed with the name change, and was allowed to continue under the old name. Five years later the Pennsylvania Conference voted to separate themselves from the other conferences of the United Missionary Church. Differences of opinion over church government, the doctrine of holiness, education, foreign missions, and financial autonomy combined to bring about the division. They also objected to what was expected to be a merger with the Missionary Church Association (which occurred in 1969).

The Pennsylvania Conference of the Mennonite Brethren in Christ adopted a new name in 1959—the Bible Fellowship Church. At this time, new articles of faith were approved, which included dropping the practice of feet washing. The structure of church government was gradually changed to a more presbyterian style. Local elders rule individual Bible Fellowship churches. Each of the individual churches sends their elders and pastors to the annual conference.

During the mid-20th century, the denomination's core soteriological viewpoint also gradually changed from its early Anabaptist/Arminian perspective to the current espousal of Reformed Theology.  However, in a departure from many other reformed churches, Bible Fellowship Churches continue the Anabaptist practice of believer's baptism.

Headquarters of the BFC are located in Whitehall, Pennsylvania. Ministries include the Bible Fellowship Board of Missions; Church Extension Ministries; Fellowship Community, a home for the aged; and Victory Valley Youth Camp. In 2005, there were 7,470 members in 61 congregations. Most of the churches are located in eastern Pennsylvania. There are also churches in New Jersey, Delaware, New York, Connecticut, Virginia, and New Mexico.

Pinebrook Bible Conference
Pinebrook Bible Conference is a Christian camp and conference center in the Pocono Mountains. Founded in 1933 by Percy Crawford, an evangelist who led a radio ministry in Philadelphia, Pinebrook hosted prominent speakers and musicians, including Billy Graham, Jack Wyrtzen, 
J. Oliver Buswell, William Bell Riley, William Henry Houghton, Robert T. Ketcham, Cliff Barrows, and George Beverly Shea.

In 1968, Pinebrook came under the umbrella of Bible Fellowship Church. On October 17, 2018, Spruce Lake took over stewardship of Pinebrook, while Bible Fellowship Church continues to offer events, retreats, and conferences at the property.

Notes

References
Encyclopedia of American Religions, J. Gordon Melton, editor
Handbook of Denominations in the United States, by Frank S. Mead, Samuel S. Hill, and Craig D. Atwood
History of the Mennonite Brethren in Christ, Jasper Huffman, editor
The Bible Fellowship Church: formerly Mennonite Brethren in Christ, Pennsylvania Conference, originally die Evangelische Mennoniten Gemeinschaft von Ost-Pennsylvanien, by Harold Patton Shelly

External links
Official Website of the Bible Fellowship Church
Bible Fellowship Church Online History Center
Pinebrook Bible Conference
Bible Fellowship Church - Board of Missions
Profile of the Bible Fellowship Church on the Association of Religion Data Archives website

Mennonite denominations
Organizations established in 1858
1858 establishments in Pennsylvania
Evangelical denominations in North America